Pop is the only studio album by the English post-punk band Tones on Tail, a side project of the Bauhaus members Daniel Ash and Kevin Haskins (who later went on to form Love and Rockets with David J), and the Bauhaus roadie Glenn Campling. It was released on 6 April 1984 by the Beggars Banquet record label.

Track listing

Critical reception 

Trouser Press opined, "while Pop [...] reveals some draggy recidivist Bauhaus tendencies, it also has real songs of modern music that show taste, delicacy and moderate imagination". AllMusic called it "an impressive, wide-ranging effort collaging a range of influences into an inspired, often unpredictable experience".

Dave Thompson, in Alternative Rock, considered the album "more serviceable ideas than realized majesty", but nonetheless a recording that "holds its place in time".

Personnel 
 Tones on Tail
 Daniel Ash — vocals, guitar, production
 Glenn Campling — bass, production
 Kevin Haskins — drums, percussion, production

 Additional personnel
 Juan Pedro Diego Ignatius Barraclough y Valls – rhythm guitar on "War"
 Caroline Lavelle – cello on "Performance"

 Technical
 Ted Sharp – engineering on tracks A3 and B1–B4
 Derek Tompkins – engineering on tracks A3 and B1–B4
 Louis Austin – engineering on track A5
 Mr. Atlas – album cover photography

References

External links 
 

Tones on Tail albums
1984 debut albums
Beggars Banquet Records albums
Albums recorded at Rockfield Studios